= Kelow Valley =

Valley in Missouri, United States

Coordinates: 37.0822728°N 90.7165088°W

Kelow Valley is a valley in the U.S. state of Missouri.

Variant names were "Kealo Valley" and "Kelo Valley". The valley has the name of Joseph Kelo, an early citizen.
